PAW Patrol is a Canadian computer-animated children's television series created by Keith Chapman and produced by Spin Master Entertainment, with animation provided by Guru Studio. In Canada, the series is primarily broadcast on TVOntario as part of the TVOKids programing block. TVO first ran previews of the show in August 2013. The series premiered on Nickelodeon in the United States on August 12, 2013.

The series focuses on a young boy named Ryder who leads a crew of search and rescue dogs that call themselves the PAW Patrol. They work together on missions to protect the shoreside community of Adventure Bay and surrounding areas. Each dog has a specific set of skills based on emergency services professions, such as a firefighter, a police officer, and an aviation pilot. They all reside in doghouses that transform into customized vehicles, or "pupmobiles", for their missions. They are also equipped with special hi-tech backpacks called "pup packs" that contain tools relating to the pups' jobs.

Spin Master has developed the show into a media franchise and released an ongoing line of toys based on it. PAW Patrol toy sales have generated millions of dollars in revenue for the corporation and increased Spin Master's presence in the preschool toy market. The show, and its associated products, have received a variety of awards and nominations from associations such as the Academy of Canadian Cinema & Television and the Academy of Television Arts & Sciences.

On March 24, 2022, the series has been renewed for a tenth season. A theatrical feature film, titled PAW Patrol: The Movie, was released on August 20, 2021, with a sequel, PAW Patrol: The Mighty Movie, scheduled to release theatrically on September 29, 2023. A spin-off series titled Rubble & Crew premiered in February 2023. On February 24, 2023, the series was renewed for an eleventh season to air in spring 2024. In early February 2023, series creator Keith Chapman said in an interview with The Hollywood Reporter magazine that the series could still be on television for another ten years or more.

Plot
Each episode of PAW Patrol follows a similar pattern. Episodes normally open with a scene depicting the dogs going about their everyday lives in Adventure Bay, often playing with dog toys or going to the local playground. Ryder, a ten-year-old boy, is advised of a problem by receiving a call for help or by witnessing a situation himself. His most frequent callers are an accident-prone marine biologist named Cap'n Turbot and the town's mayor, Mayor Goodway. Ryder always alerts the dogs via their blinking pet tags. The team members report to their base, the Lookout, and enter its elevator. Marshall typically arrives last causing a humorous mishap that makes the other pups laugh as the elevator rises, although Rubble causes the elevator gag in some episodes. When they reach the top floor, they arrange themselves in a line. Chase announces that the team is ready for action as Ryder tells the pups what has happened. He chooses several members of the team, normally two first responders, to help solve whatever problem has emerged. They ride a slide down to their vehicles and complete their mission. The PAW Patrol's missions include rescuing people, stopping different dangers, and thwarting the devious plots of Mayor Humdinger of Foggy Bottom in later episodes. When they have finished, Ryder says his catchphrase: "Whenever you're in trouble, just yelp for help!" (or a variation of that in later episodes). Then Ryder congratulates the pups.

Episodes

Characters

PAW Patrol members

Original members
 Ryder (voiced by Owen Mason in Season 1 to the middle of Season 2, by Elijha Hammill in the middle of Season 2 to late Season 3, Jaxon Mercey in Late Season 3 to the middle of Season 6, Joey Nijem in late Season 6 to the middle of Season 7, Beckett Hipkiss in late Season 7 to late Season 8, Kai Harris in late Season 8 onwards, Will Brisbin in PAW Patrol: The Movie.) - Ryder is the tech-savvy and gifted boy who is the leader of the PAW Patrol. He is the caregiver of his best friend Chase. His standard vehicle is the red ATV that is able to convert into a PWC and snowmobile.
 Chase (voiced by Tristan Samuel in Season 1, Max Calinescu in Seasons 2 to Season 4, Justin Kelly in Season 5 onwards, Iain Armitage in PAW Patrol: The Movie) - Chase is a 7-year-old German Shepherd who serves as a police dog, spy dog, and the second-in-command of the PAW Patrol. He is Ryder's best friend. He has a good sense of smell and sight, but also has a cat and feather allergy. His usual vehicle is the royal blue-colored police cruiser.
 Marshall (voiced by Gage Munroe in Season 1, Drew Davis in Season 2 to Season 5, Lukas Engel in Season 6, Kingsley Marshall in late-Season 6 to Season 8, Christian Corrao in late-Season 8 onwards) - Marshall is a clumsy but competent 6-year-old Dalmatian who serves as a firefighter and paramedic dog. He arrives last and always causes a humorous mishap with the other pups in the elevator or in the PAW Patroller. His main vehicle is a red fire truck.
 Skye (voiced by Kallan Holley in Season 1 to Season 5, Lilly Bartlam in Season 6 onwards) - Skye is a 7-year-old cockapoo who serves as the team's air rescue pup. She has a tendency to do backflips. She usually pilots a grey helicopter with pink highlights.
 Rocky (voiced by Stuart Ralston in Season 1 to Season 2, Samuel Faraci in Season 3 to the middle of Season 7, Jackson Reid in late Season 7 onwards, Callum Shoniker in PAW Patrol: The Movie) - Rocky is a 6-year-old mixed breed who serves as a recycling and handyman pup. He dislikes getting wet during water-missions. His main vehicle is a lime green-colored cross between a garbage truck and a forklift that can convert into a tugboat as of Season 3.
 Rubble (voiced by Devan Cohen in Season 1 to Season 5, Keegan Hedley in Season 6 to the middle of Season 8, Lucien Duncan-Reid in the middle of Season 8 onwards, Luxton Handspiker in Rubble & Crew) - Rubble is a 5-year-old bulldog who serves as a construction pup. His main vehicle is the yellow bulldozer that usually has a drill and later has a crane attachment as of Season 2.
 Zuma (voiced by Alex Thorne in Season 1 to the middle of Season 4, Carter Thorne in the middle of Season 4 to Season 5, Shayle Simons in Season 6 to Season 8, Jordan Mazeral in Season 9 onwards) - Zuma is a 5-year-old chocolate Labrador Retriever who serves as an aquatic rescue pup. His main vehicle is the orange-colored hovercraft which can run quite well on land as well as water, able to launch a lifebuoy, and is able to convert into a submarine that is equipped with a large claw-arm by Season 2.

Later members
 Cap'n Turbot (voiced by Ron Pardo) - Cap'n Turbot is the PAW Patrol's most frequent caller and an occasional member of the team in the Mer-pup themed special episodes. He is a marine biologist who knows all kinds of animal facts and runs a lighthouse on Seal Island. His main vehicle is a boat called the Flounder. Along with Everest, he was added to the opening theme in season three.
 Robo-Dog - Robo-Dog is a robotic dog introduced in "Pups Save Ryder's Robot". He serves as the driver for the PAW Patrol's larger vehicles. Unlike the other dogs, Robo-Dog communicates only in robotic barks.
 Everest (voiced by Berkley Silverman) - Everest is an 8-year-old purple-hued Siberian Husky who serves as a snow rescue pup in emergencies relating to snow, ice or mountains. She was introduced in the episode "The New Pup" where she helps them on a mission and originally lived at the South Pole. Along with Cap'n Turbot, she was added to the opening theme in season three. Her main vehicle is a silver snowcat with bright teal and orange highlights, which is equipped with a trail clearing claw.
 Tracker (voiced by David Lopez in Season 3 to Season 7, Mateo Carnovale in Season 8 onwards) - Tracker is a 4-year-old brown-and-white Chihuahua/Potcake mix who serves as a jungle rescue pup. He is the youngest pup on the PAW Patrol and was introduced in the Season 3 episode "Tracker Joins the Pups". He was originally shown to be afraid of the dark. His main vehicle is a white and olive Jeep in zebra print, and he is bilingual, speaking both Spanish and English.
 Tuck (voiced by Eamon Hanson in Season 6 to Season 7, Roman Pesino in Season 9 onwards) and Ella (voiced by Isabella Leo) - Tuck and Ella are two Golden Retriever siblings who are known as the Mighty Twins. A meteor gave them superpowers, where Tuck can shrink at will and Ella can grow at will. They were introduced in the Season 6 episode, "Mighty Pups, Super Paws: Pups Meet the Mighty Twins" where they help the Mighty Pups fight their archenemy the Ladybird. Their vehicle is a sky-blue "Mighty Car" that splits into two "Mighty Motorcycles".
 Rex (voiced by Luxton Handspiker in Season 7, Hartley Bernier in Season 9 onwards) - Rex is a paraplegic Bernese Mountain Dog who uses a high-tech dog wheelchair to get around and serves him as an expert on dinosaurs and operates in the Dino Wilds where dinosaurs still live. He was introduced in the Season 7 episode "Dino Rescue: Pups and the Lost Dino Eggs" where he and Ryder introduce the PAW Patrol to the Dino Wilds and Cap'n Turbot's relatives who operated there. His vehicle is the azure and chartreuse Stegosaurus-type vehicle that has a ramp that allows him to enter and exit it.
 The Cat Pack - The Cat Pack are a group of talking cats formed by Wild who sometimes help out the pups. The Cat Pack help the PAW Patrol by thinking and acting like a cat. Each of its members has high-tech armor and vehicles that are modeled after a big cat.
 Wild (voiced by Tristan Mammitzsch) - Wild (formerly called Wild Cat) is a tabby cat as well as the first feline member of the PAW Patrol and the leader of the Cat Pack. He is graceful and smooth, but has a fear of mice. He was introduced in the Season 7 episode "Moto Pups: Pups vs. the Ruff-Ruff Pack". By Season 9, Wild was revealed to have founded the Cat Pack where his armor grants him the speed of a cheetah. His vehicle is a motorcycle with retractable claws in its wheels and it gets replaced with a cheetah-themed version of it after Wild's original motorcycle was eaten by an enlarged Meow-Meow.
 Rory (voiced by Tianna SwamiNathan) - A British Shorthair and a member of the Cat Pack. She dislikes sitting still and loves to take cat naps and exercise. Her armor is modeled after a white tiger and rides a white tiger-themed car where she possesses tiger-like pouncing abilities.
 Leo (voiced by Kingston Crooks) - Leo is a tabby cat and a member of the Cat Pack. Like Wild, he is shown to have a fear of mice. His armor is modeled after a lion and rides a lion-themed jeep where he possesses lion-like strength.
 Shade (voiced by Markeda McKay) - Shade is a tuxedo cat and a member of the Cat Pack. She has purple and black-spotted headphones where she listens to music, yarn balls, laser pointers, and climbing skills. Her uniform is modeled after a jaguar and rides a jaguar-themed car while possessing jaguar-like stealth.
 Liberty (voiced by Marsai Martin in PAW Patrol: The Movie, Tymika Tafari in Season 9 onwards) - Liberty is a dachshund from Adventure City. She was introduced in PAW Patrol: The Movie where she helped the PAW Patrol at the time when Mayor Humdinger was the Mayor of Adventure City. Her main vehicle is a coral-pink scooter with blue and white highlights.
 Al (voiced by Nylan Parthipan) - Al is a Basset Hound truck driver with trucking experience and even speaks trucker. He was introduced in the Season 9 episode "Big Truck Pups: Pups Stop a Flood" where he helped the PAW Patrol and Mayor Goodway prevent a dam from bursting. His vehicle is a gray and red big truck with two grabber claws.
 Coral (voiced by Kaia Ozdemir) - Coral is a cockapoo and a Mer-pup from Puplantis, later revealed to be Skye's long-lost cousin. She was introduced in the Season 9 episode "Aqua Pups: Pups Save a Floating Castle" where she assisted her cousin and her team in saving what was for the longest time her home. Her vehicle is a teal, silver, and purple submarine in the shape of a seahorse which can also transform into a motorcycle for land travel.

Supporting characters

 Mayor Goodway (voiced by Deann Degruijter in Season 1 to early-Season 7, Kim Roberts in late-Season 7 onwards) - Mayor Goodway is the mayor of Adventure Bay who lives at the City Hall and is one of the PAW Patrol's frequent callers. She can be very panicky at times and also works to outsmart Mayor Humdinger.
 Chickaletta - Chickaletta is Mayor Goodway's pet chicken that she carries around in her purse. She generally ignores what is going on around her. Chickaletta is also shown to be a member of the Mini-Patrol.
 Francois Turbot (voiced by Peter Cugno) - Francois Turbot is Cap'n Turbot's cousin and research partner who lives with him in the Seal Island lighthouse. He works as a zoologist, artist, and nature photographer. He has a thick French accent and often uses French phrases in place of English words.
 Katie (voiced by Katherine Forrester) - Katie is a young girl who works at the Adventure Bay pet parlor. She is loving and caring.
 Cali - Cali is Katie's pet cat whom she is usually seen with. She is also a member of the Mini-Patrol.
 Mr. Porter (voiced by Blair Williams) - Mr. Porter is the proprietor of Porter's Café in Adventure Bay as well as the grandfather of Alex Porter.
 Alex Porter (voiced by Christian Distefano in Season 1 to Mid-Season 5, Wyatt White in Mid-Season 5 to Mid-Season 9, Simon Webster in Mid-Season 9-present) - Alex Porter is a young boy who lives in Adventure Bay and is Mr. Porter's grandson. He is rather impatient. He is the leader of the Mini-Patrol, a PAW Patrol-inspired group consisting of himself and some pet animals which is seldom successful.
 Jake (voiced by Scott McCord) - Jake is a snowboarder from Adventure Bay who operates the snowboarding resort and is the caregiver of Everest.
 Farmer Yumi (voiced by Hiromi Okuyama in Season 1, Stephany Seki in Season 2-present) - Farmer Yumi is a farmer in Adventure Bay. She cares greatly for her animals.
 Farmer Al (voiced by Ron Pardo) - Farmer Al is the farmer of Moo Juice Dairy Farm in Adventure Bay and the husband of Farmer Yumi as of "Pups Save a Wedding".
 Carlos (voiced by Lucius Hoyos in Season 2, Jaiden Cannatelli in Mid-Season 3 to Mid-Season 7, Diego Rieger in late Season 7 to Season 8, Lucas Miranda in Season 9-Present) - Carlos is Ryder's pen pal from the jungle and the caregiver of Tracker.
 Daring Danny X (voiced by Daniel DeSanto in Season 3 to early Season 5, Jonathan Malen in late Season 5-present) - Danny is a 10-year-old boy who made his debut in "Pups Save Daring Danny X". He was motivated to become a daredevil by a stunt Ryder performed during a rescue. A running gag is that when someone refers him as "Danny" or "Daring Danny", he would quote "That's Daring Danny X".
 Princess of Barkingburg (voiced by Caoimhe Judd) - A young girl who is the ruler of Barkingburg. The PAW Patrol often help her out when it comes to different threats to Barkingburg.
 Earl of Barkingburg (voiced by Adrian Truss) - An unnamed elderly man who works as the Earl of Barkingburg. He is often seen with the Princess of Barkingburg and often acts as an advisor to her.
 Dr. Tammy Turbot (voiced by Marisa McIntyre) - Dr. Tammy Turbot is the sister of Cap'n Turbot and the cousin of Francois Turbot. She operates in the Dino Wilds where she works as a dinosaur doctor and also serves as the caregiver of Rex.
 Taylor Turbot (voiced by Ava Ro) - Taylor Turbot is the daughter of Dr. Tammy Turbot and the niece of Cap'n Turbot and Francois Turbot.

Villains
 Mayor Humdinger (voiced by Ron Pardo) - Mayor Humdinger is the mayor of a neighboring town called Foggy Bottom who is the main antagonist of the series. He is the PAW Patrol and Mayor Goodway's biggest rival where he is always coming up with new plans to upstage Adventure Bay and make Foggy Bottom better which always get thwarted by the PAW Patrol. For some of his schemes, Humdinger would take up an alias that would eventually get his identity exposed. A running gag is that he would get annoyed if something happens to his top hat. On occasion, he would enlist the PAW Patrol's help should the Kitten Catastrophe Crew get into any danger. In PAW Patrol: The Movie, Humdinger briefly became the Mayor of Adventure City due to his name being the only one on the ballot and the leading candidate suddenly dropping out until his latest plan was thwarted by the PAW Patrol which led to his arrest and removal from his position of Mayor of Adventure City.
 Kitten Catastrophe Crew - The Kitten Catastrophe Crew are Mayor Humdinger's helpers and the villainous feline counterparts of the PAW Patrol. They will usually do what they are asked, but sometimes they can be stubborn and disobey Mayor Humdinger.
 Meow Meow - A robotic cat that serves as Mayor Humdinger's answer for Robo-Dog. When the Transformo-Zapper was used on Meow Meow during the "Cat Pack" episodes, Meow Meow grows to the size of a tiger, speaks English, and eats metal in order to keep it's energy meter high.
 Harold Humdinger (voiced by Chance Hurtsfield) - Harold Humdinger is the nephew of Mayor Humdinger who possesses technopathy when empowered by a meteor fragment making him the antagonist of the "Mighty Pups, Super Paws" episodes.
 The Cheetah (voiced by Addison Holley) - The Cheetah is Mayor Humdinger's cousin and Harold Humdinger's cousin once removed who first showed up in "Ready Race Rescue". She is a race car driver who will do anything to win a race.
 Sweetie (voiced by Anya Cooke) - Sweetie is a West Highland White Terrier who is the pet dog of the Princess of Barkingburg who often conspires to become the next Queen of Barkingburg.
 Busby - Busby is a robotic toy frog who serves as Sweetie's chew toy and minion.
 Sid Swashbuckle (voiced by Charles Vandervaart) - Sid Swashbuckle is a pirate who is the captain of the Swashbuckle Sloop. He has a tendency to repeat the word "need" two times.
 Arrby (voiced by Meesha Contreras) - Arrby is a dachshund pirate dog who is the first mate of Sid Swashbuckle. He tends to refer to his boss as "Cap'n Boss Mr. Swashbuckle Sir".
 Ruff-Ruff Pack - The Ruff-Ruff Pack are a group of dogs that make up their own biker gang and have a rivalry with Wild Cat.
 Hubcab (voiced by Julain Crispo in Season 7, Kyle Hogdson in Season 9 present) - Hubcap is a French Bulldog and the leader of the Ruff-Ruff Pack.
 Dwayne (voiced by Osias Reid Kyle in Season 7, Levi Dombokah in Season 9 present) - Dwayne is a Great Dane and member of the Ruff-Ruff Pack who is not very bright. He operates the motorcycle that has a sidecar which Hubcap rides in.
 Gasket (voiced by Madison Abbott) - Gasket is an Alaskan Malamute and member of the Ruff-Ruff Pack. She would be the ones to invent things that would help the Ruff-Ruff Pack. A running gag is that she would come up with an idea which Hubcap would take credit for.

Production
According to Spin Master, the concept for PAW Patrol stemmed from a prototype for a transforming truck toy that Spin Master co-founder Ronnen Harary designed in 2010. Later the same year, the company requested some proposals for a television show based on the transforming toy, and accepted one from Bob the Builder creator Keith Chapman. Chapman sketched early designs of the PAW Patrol team under the working title Raffi & the Rescue Dogs. Spin Master hired toy designers to develop the format further; after the concept was in place, they started designing merchandise.

Chapman's original pitch focused on the idea that the six PAW Patrol dogs were rescued by Ryder before joining the team. Scott Kraft, the show's first writer, and Jamie Whitney, the show's first director, decided to abandon the rescued dog theme in 2012. The name of the series' protagonist, Ryder, was changed multiple times during production; he was originally called Raffi, Roddy, and Robbie before Spin Master settled on Ryder.

According to a 2017 Spin Master interview, "everything pup-related was debated endlessly: names, sizes, ages, breeds." The pups' designs underwent major changes after Chapman's pitch; they were very realistic at first, with unique fur and textures based on their breeds, but they were later simplified and made more cartoonish. Cap'n Turbot's unique design, with his distinctive bead eyes and large nose, was based on the design of Chapman's Bob the Builder character. Ryder's hairstyle was based on Ronnen Harary's hair.

In January 2012, Spin Master began approaching television broadcasters. The company negotiated a broadcast partnership with Nickelodeon, and the network first announced that it had picked up PAW Patrol at the 2013 Licensing Expo in Las Vegas, Nevada. The series became Spin Master's first solely-owned intellectual property (IP) once it was released in August 2013.

Since it began production, the show's animation has been provided by Guru Studio. In a 2016 interview with Maclean's Magazine, Guru president Frank Falcone stated that his studio's animators were originally suspicious of the show's "toyetic" concept. The series' rock-inspired original score was composed by the Ontario-based group Voodoo Highway Music & Post. The opening theme song and the ending song used in each episode include vocals performed by Scott Simons.

With each season of the show, new supporting characters and themes are introduced in its episodes. In a May 2016 interview for the Toronto Star, Spin Master president Ben Gadbois stated that his company would continue to introduce additional characters and concepts to increase the franchise's longevity and to expand upon the success of tie-in merchandise. In August of the same year, Ronnen Harary explained that these changes were intended to keep the show's content "fresh" and "relevant".

Release
The series has been sold to TV networks in over 160 countries.

In the United States, the series is aired on Nickelodeon as well as the Nick Jr. channel. Select episodes are available to stream on the Noggin app and Paramount+. In Canada, the series is primarily shown on TVOKids, Knowledge Kids, Télé-Québec, City Saskatchewan, Treehouse, and CBC Kids.

As required for Canadian-American programs aired on federally-funded networks, PAW Patrol has been dubbed in French for Quebec broadcasts and for its broadcast in France on TF1. Canal Panda airs a European Portuguese dub, and it aired on MBC3 in the Middle East. 
In the United Kingdom, a British English dub was released in November 2013, using the same scripts as the Canadian-American version with minor changes and shown on Channel 5 and Nick Jr. UK. Also, a Welsh-language dub of the show titled Patrôl Pawennau is shown on S4C as part of its Cyw block. Anione, JEI TV, and KBS have all broadcast the Korean-dubbed version. The show has been aired in the Icelandic language on Iceland's public broadcaster RÚV since 2015. The first two seasons were shown in Finnish on Yle TV2. The video on demand platform Le.com obtained broadcast rights for a Mandarin Chinese-dubbed version of PAW Patrol in April 2016. It aired on MiniMini+ in Poland, e-Junior in the United Arab Emirates, and Clan TVE in Spain. On April 6, 2019, TV Tokyo premiered a Japanese dub of the show, starring Megumi Han as Ryder, who is renamed "Kento" (ケント). In India, a Hindi dub of the series airs on Nick Jr. India.

Reception

Critical reception
PAW Patrol has received largely positive reviews from critics. Common Sense Media reviewer Emily Ashby gave the show a four-star rating, stating that "perhaps the show's best attribute is how it demonstrates the value of thoughtful problem-solving". Randy Miller of DVD Talk recommended the show, calling it "packed with all the harmless action and cornball jokes that kids can't help but snicker at". Stuff.co.nz reviewer Pattie Pegler also wrote favourably of the series, but felt that some of the characters "seem rather arbitrary, like Rocky the Recycling Pup". The About Group's Carey Bryson gave the series a mixed review, criticizing its "formulaic" nature but affirming that the "show is not without funny moments".

A research study, commissioned by Sky in March 2016, reported that 16 percent of surveyed British and Irish children named PAW Patrol as their favorite program.

Criticism had been directed toward the show's unequal gender representation because initially the team of dogs was primarily male and included only one female character. Brandy King of the Center on Media and Child Health "found the gender imbalance immediately noticeable" while watching the program. Today's Parent noted in April 2015 that PAW Patrol images appeared frequently on Twitter with the hashtag "#IncludeTheGirls". In response to these criticisms, the writers added an additional female character named Everest, a Siberian Husky and snow rescue dog, starting in season 2.

The show's mobile app game, PAW Patrol: Air and Sea Adventure, was accused of behaving manipulatively towards younger viewers in a 2018 study by the University of Michigan which focused on app-based advertising techniques. Within the game, characters recognizable from the show would express disappointment if players did not purchase items with money.

In a 2020 paper published in the journal Crime, Media, Culture, PAW Patrol is criticized for sending the message that corporations are more capable of providing social services than the state. Author Liam Kennedy argues that the show "encourages complicity in a global capitalist system that (re)produces inequalities and causes environmental harms." Kennedy suggests that PAW Patrol echoes the "core tenets of neoliberalism" by depicting the state and politicians as either unethical or incompetent while the PAW Patrol corporation is entrusted with crimefighting and conservation.

Ratings
PAW Patrol has received consistently high ratings on Nickelodeon. Viacom CEO Philippe Dauman cited the series as a source of Nickelodeon's 2014 ratings growth. It ranked as the highest-rated, preschool TV program in the United States in November 2013 and held that position throughout the spring 2014 season. The spot was briefly overtaken by Team Umizoomi reruns in July 2016, but PAW Patrol reclaimed the title later the same month. Bloomberg L.P. described PAW Patrol as part of a "creative resurgence" that increased the Nick Jr. channel's viewership in 2016. At Nickelodeon's 2016 upfront presentation for future advertisers, Cyma Zarghami named PAW Patrol one of two preschool shows to have significantly helped boost ratings for the network (the other being Blaze and the Monster Machines).

In March 2015, two back-to-back premieres of the show ranked among the top twenty weekday showings (among total viewers) in Australia. In May 2015, it was reported that PAW Patrol broadcasts on TF1 had been viewed by 45 per cent of households in France with preschool-aged children.

Cultural impact
The show has received recognition from public figures and celebrities. Canadian Prime Minister Justin Trudeau and his children are fans of the show; Trudeau mentioned the characters by name in a 2017 speech. After performing at the Super Bowl LII halftime show, Justin Timberlake filmed a segment for The Tonight Show Starring Jimmy Fallon in which he named Chase as his favourite PAW Patrol character and held a Chase plush toy. During his opening monologue for the 90th Academy Awards, host Jimmy Kimmel joked that Timothée Chalamet was missing PAW Patrol to attend the ceremony, but "Ryder and his team of pups saved the day, so".

The show was satirized by The Onion in a 2018 parody article; referencing police brutality in the United States, the article claimed that the show's writers defended police dog, Chase, for shooting an unarmed black lab.

In the wake of the George Floyd protests, the show was criticized for presenting a "good-cop archetype" after a post appeared on the show's Twitter account announcing that they would go dark in memory of Floyd received negative backlash. In July 2020, White House Press Secretary Kayleigh McEnany claimed the show was canceled due to "cancel culture" but the show denied any such termination.

Awards and nominations
In 2014, the series' theme song was nominated for Outstanding Original Song – Main Title and Promo in the 41st Daytime Creative Arts Emmy Awards. In 2016, the season two episode "Pups Save a Mer-Pup" was nominated for Best Animated Television/Broadcast Production for Preschool Children in the 43rd Annie Awards. As of 2023, PAW Patrol has received twenty five Canadian Screen Award nominations with seventh wins.

Films

In November 2017, Ronnen Harary confirmed that Spin Master was "currently considering whether to extend the PAW Patrol franchise into feature films at some point in the next 12 to 24 months." Animation tests were conducted in 2017 to measure how the characters "would translate onto the big screen" and the company developed a film script.
 
On May 9, 2019, it was confirmed during Spin Master's First Quarter 2019 Earnings Conference Call that an animated theatrical film based on the series, titled PAW Patrol: The Movie was in the works with an August 2021 release date. On November 8, 2019, it was announced that Mikros Image in Montreal would handle the animation. Development of the film was confirmed on February 21, 2020, with Cal Brunker attached as director. Spin Master Entertainment produced the movie with an association in both Nickelodeon Movies and Paramount Pictures. On April 24, 2020, the release date was announced to be August 20, 2021.

A first look at the film was shown on Nickelodeon Kids' Choice Awards 2021 on March 13, 2021.

It was announced on November 3, 2021, that a sequel, titled PAW Patrol: The Mighty Movie, will be released on September 29, 2023.

Box office performance

Other media

Video games
In February 2018, a video game based on the series, titled PAW Patrol: On a Roll was announced. Developed by Torus Games and published by Outright Games, it was released for PlayStation 4, Xbox One, Nintendo Switch, and Microsoft Windows on October 23, 2018. Another video game, titled PAW Patrol Mighty Pups: Save Adventure Bay, was announced on July 17, 2020. Developed by Drakhar Studio and also published by Outright Games, it was released for PlayStation 4, Xbox One, Nintendo Switch, Stadia, and Microsoft Windows on November 6, 2020. Another video game for the film, titled PAW Patrol The Movie: Adventure City Calls was announced on June 10, 2021. Developed by Drakhar Studio and also published by Outright Games, it was released for PlayStation 4, Xbox One, Nintendo Switch, Stadia, and Microsoft Windows on August 13, 2021. It was announced in May 2022 that Outright Games is releasing a racing game for the series titled PAW Patrol: Grand Prix. Developed by 3D Clouds and was released for PlayStation 4, PlayStation 5, Xbox One, Xbox Series X|S, Nintendo Switch, Google Stadia, and Microsoft Windows on September 30, 2022. A DLC for Grand Prix titled Race in Barkingburg was released on December 2, 2022. A new DLC added a battle arena mode title Pup Treat Arena was released on March 10, 2023.

Live events
In April 2016, a stage show titled PAW Patrol Live: Race to the Rescue was announced. The show features the PAW Patrol characters competing in a race. It toured Canada, the United States, Mexico, New Zealand, Australia and the Philippines. A sequel show, titled PAW Patrol Live: The Great Pirate Adventure, was announced in June 2017. It follows the PAW Patrol as they rescue Cap'n Turbot from a cavern, and it will tour the same countries as its predecessor. The shows are produced by VStar Entertainment Group, which is best known for producing the popular Sesame Street Live touring shows for 37 years.

Mascots based on the PAW Patrol characters have appeared at events across Canada, the United States, and the United Kingdom. They joined an "Etch A Sketch Day" celebration at Spin Master's office in Toronto on July 26, 2016. The characters, along with replicas of the Lookout tower from the program, were included as part of the Nick Jr. Play Date Tour in autumn 2015. Marshall and Chase made appearances at shopping malls throughout Nottingham, Suffolk, and Somerset in the U.K. in the summer of 2016. Multiple meet-and-greet events attracted far more attendees than expected, with some reaching over 5,000 visitors. They appeared for the first time in Northern Ireland at Glenarm Castle on July 13, 2016. They are scheduled to appear regularly in a Nickelodeon-themed area of the Thurrock's Lakeside Shopping Centre located on the outskirts of London, England.

Like many children's properties, unauthorized productions and events using copyright infringing costumes featuring the show's characters have attracted the attention of Spin Master and Nickelodeon. In February 2016, several Greene King pubs in the U.K. scheduled breakfast events with costumed characters modelled after the pups. Nickelodeon forced the chain to stop every event by threatening a lawsuit if they went ahead. There was some consumer backlash as a result, but the events were not held.

Rubble spin-off series

On November 3, 2021, Nickelodeon and Spin Master stated that an untitled spin-off series focusing on one of the main six pups was in development, and was set to premiere in 2023. On March 24, 2022, it was announced that the spin-off series would focus on Rubble. In November 2022, the series' title was revealed to be Rubble & Crew. Rather than Guru Studio, the spinoff is animated by Jam Filled Entertainment, and premiered on February 3, 2023.

Merchandise

On May 18, 2014, Spin Master introduced a toy line based on the television series at Toys "R" Us locations across Canada. The line was not distributed to international markets until June 22 of the same year. Dion Vlachos was in charge of the U.S. product launch.

PAW Patrol has since become one of Spin Master's most profitable brands. Analysts for the National Bank of Canada reported that toys and games based on the show accounted for approximately $245 million U.S. (or 25 per cent) of Spin Master's gross product sales for 2015. Spin Master chairman Anton Rabie noted in August 2016 that the "continuing strength" of PAW Patrol toys, in addition to new acquisitions and movie licenses, made up 40.5 per cent of the firm's second-quarter revenue. Marketing manager Emma Eden said that the toys were responsible for increasing the company's presence in the preschool market. Throughout 2016, Spin Master's revenue grew more in this market than in any other toy category. PAW Patrol has been cited as the sole reason for this.

The NPD Group named PAW Patrol the top new toy brand of 2015 in the United Kingdom. The group also reported that it was the best-selling preschool license in France in the first quarter of 2015. Dave Brandon, the chief executive officer of Toys "R" Us, listed the PAW Patroller vehicle toy as one of the 2015 holiday season's "hottest" items. Argos the U.K. catalogue retailer included the PAW Patrol Air Patroller vehicle on its list of the toys it predicts will be bestsellers during the Christmas 2016 season.

References

External links

 
 PAW Patrol at NickJr.com
 PAW Patrol at TVOKids.com
 

2010s Canadian animated television series
2020s Canadian animated television series
2010s Canadian children's television series
2020s Canadian children's television series
2013 Canadian television series debuts
Animated television series about dogs
Animated television series about children
Canadian children's animated action television series
Canadian children's animated adventure television series
Canadian children's animated comedy television series
Canadian children's animated fantasy television series
Canadian computer-animated television series
English-language television shows
Nick Jr. original programming
TVO original programming
Toy brands
Television shows adapted into video games